This is a demography of the population of Saint Lucia including population density, ethnicity, education level, health of the populace, economic status, religious affiliations and other aspects of the population.

Population

According to the 2018 population census Saint Lucia has a population of 179,667.
The population is evenly divided between urban and rural areas.

Vital statistics

Structure of the population
Structure of the population (01.07.2009) (Estimates) :

Ethnic groups 
Saint Lucia's population is predominantly African/black (141,216 in 2010; 85.3% of the total population) or of mixed African-European descent (17,965; 10.8%). 2.2% of the population is East Indian (3,575 residents in 2010) and 0.6% white (991). 
Saint Lucia also has a small Amerindian (Carib) population. During the past decades the Amerindian (Carib) increased from 366 at the 1991 census (0.3% of the population), 803 at the 2001 census (0.5% of the population) to 951 in 2010 (0.6% of the population.

The remaining 0.5% of the population includes Chinese (0.1%) and people from the Middle East (0.1%).

Languages
The official language is English. Saint Lucian Creole French (Kwéyòl), which is colloquially referred to as Patois ("Patwa"), is spoken by 95% of the population. This Antillean Creole is used in literature and music, and is gaining official acknowledgement. As it developed during the early period of French colonisation, the Creole is derived chiefly from French and West African languages, with some vocabulary from Carib and other sources. Saint Lucia is a member of La Francophonie.

Religion
According to the 2010 census, 90.2% percent of the population of Saint Lucia is considered Christian, 2.3% has a non-Christian religion and 5.9% has no religion or did not state a religion (1.4%).

Roughly two thirds of Christians are Roman Catholics (61.5% of the total population), a reflection of early French influence on the island,  and   25.5% are  Protestant. The Seventh-day Adventists constitute the largest Protestant group, with 10.4% of the population. Pentecostals are the second largest group (8.9%). The next largest group are Evangelicals (2.3% of the population), followed by Baptists (2.2%).  Other Christians include Anglicanism (3.4%) and  Jehovah's Witnesses (1.1%),

The number of non-Christians is small. These religious groups include the Rastafarian Movement (1.9% of the population), Hinduism (0.3%) and Muslims (0.1%).

See also
Population by district

References

 
Society of Saint Lucia